Nanjing Broadcast Television Station, is a television network in the Nanjing, China area.  It is the owner of the Nanjing Broadcasting Network and Nanjing Radio.

External links
Official Website
Official Website (translated to English with Babelfish)
Nanjing Broadcasting Network (translated to English with Babelfish)

Television networks in China
Mass media in Nanjing